Montreal Assault is the first DVD by Canadian deathcore band Despised Icon, released January 27, 2009 through Century Media. The DVD was peaked at #123 on the Billboard Top Music Videos.

Background
Montreal Assault features the band performing on June 5, 2008 at Club Soda in their hometown, Montreal, Quebec, Canada. The show was filmed by David Brodsky with sound produced by Yannick St-Amand, Despised Icon's former guitarist. The DVD also features an hour-long documentary by Reconstructed Media that retraces the band's career, showing never-before-released footage.

Vocalist Alexandre Erian stated:

Track listing

Personnel
Despised Icon
Alexandre Erian – lead vocals
Steve Marois – lead vocals 
Sebastien Piché – bass
Eric Jarrin – guitars
Al Glassman – guitars
Alexandre Pelletier – drums

Production
David Brodsky – filming, editing
Yannick St-Amand – sound production
Felix Rancourt – cover artwork

References

Despised Icon albums
2009 video albums
Live video albums
2009 live albums
Century Media Records albums
Century Media Records video albums